Paul Blake may refer to:

 Paul Blake (actor, born 1904) (1904–1960), British actor
 Paul Blake (actor), most famous for portraying Greedo in the 1977 film Star Wars
 Paul Blake (basketball), current chairman of the British Basketball League
 Frankie Paul (1965–2017), Jamaica singer, real name Paul Blake
 Paul Blake (field hockey) (born 1983), South African field hockey player
 Paul Blake (athlete) (born 1990), British Paralympic athlete
 Paul Blake (theatre) (born 1941), American theatre writer, producer, and director